was a prominent Japanese koto player, specializing in contemporary music.

Overview  
Nosaka was born on May 6, 1938 in Tokyo.

She was known for her work with the 20-string (nijū-gen) and 25-string bass kotos, which she helped to develop. The Japanese composers Minoru Miki and Akira Ifukube composed for her.

Nosaka joined the Pro Musica Nipponia ensemble in 1965, continuing as an active member for 17 years. She released several CDs.

In 2003, she adopted the name Sōju, the 2nd, after the death of her mother, the first Sōju.

References
Wade, Bonnie C. (1994). "Keiko Nosaka and the 20-Stringed Koto: Tradition and Modernization in Japanese Music." In The Musicological Juncture: Essays in Honor of Rulan Chao Pian, ed. Bell Yung and Joseph S. C. Lam (Cambridge, Massachusetts: Harvard University), pp. 184–98.

External links
Official website
Keiko Nosaka biography

So players
Musicians from Tokyo
1938 births
2019 deaths